John L. Westdahl (June 17, 1916 – February 18, 1968) was an American insurance agent, construction worker, and politician.

Westdahl lived in St. Mary's, Kusilvak Census Area, Alaska and was a construction worker and insurance agent. He was a Democrat. Westdahl served in the Alaska House of Representatives from 1967 until his death in 1968. Westdahl was attending a meeting in Anchorage, Alaska about native land claims. He died from natural causes at the Kodiak Motel at Anchorage, Alaska.

References

1918 births
1968 deaths
Businesspeople from Alaska
Democratic Party members of the Alaska House of Representatives
Native American state legislators in Alaska
People from Kusilvak Census Area, Alaska
Yupik people
20th-century American politicians
20th-century American businesspeople